This is a list of members of the South Australian Legislative Council from 1877 to 1881.

This was the sixth Legislative Council to be elected under the Constitution of 1856, which provided for a house consisting of eighteen members to be elected from the whole colony acting as one electoral district "The Province"; that six members, selected by lot, should be replaced at General Elections after four years, another six to be replaced four years later and thenceforth each member should have a term of twelve years.

Six seats were declared vacant by rotation in 1877, filled by Morgan, Crozier, Baker, English, Pearce and Hughes.

References
Parliament of South Australia — Statistical Record of the Legislature

Members of South Australian parliaments by term
19th-century Australian politicians